Boa Entrada is a settlement in the central part of the island of Santiago, Cape Verde. In 2010 its population was 1,119. It is situated 2 km north of Assomada city centre. The area is intensively cultivated, especially with sugarcane and mango trees.

Kapok tree
There is a very large kapok tree near the village of Boa Entrada, standing at the bottom of a valley, 400 m above sea level. It is the largest tree on Santiago and, probably, in the whole of the Republic of Cape Verde. The kapok tree is about 25 m high and was identified as an Important Bird Area (IBA) by BirdLife International because it supports a colony of purple herons.

References

External links
A photo from Boa Entrada

Villages and settlements in Santiago, Cape Verde
Santa Catarina, Cape Verde
Important Bird Areas of Cape Verde